The 2012 Fifth Third Bank Tennis Championships was a professional tennis tournament played on outdoor hard courts. It was the 17th edition for men and the 15th edition for women, of the tournament and was part of the 2012 ITF Women's Circuit and the 2012 ATP Challenger Tour. It took place in Lexington, Kentucky, United States between 23 and 29 July 2012.

ATP single main-draw entrants

Seeds

 1 Rankings are as of July 16, 2012.

Other entrants
The following players received wildcards into the singles main draw:
  Chase Buchanan
  Christian Harrison
  Daniel Kosakowski
  Eric Quigley

The following players received entry as a special exempt into the singles main draw:
  Adrien Bossel
  Daniel King-Turner

The following players received entry from the qualifying draw:
  Sekou Bangoura
  Thomas Fabbiano
  Austin Krajicek
  Toshihide Matsui

WTA singles main-draw entrants

Seeds

 1 Rankings are as of July 16, 2012.

Other entrants
The following players received wildcards into the singles main draw:
  Mallory Burdette
  Bethanie Mattek-Sands
  Shelby Rogers
  Alexandra Stevenson

The following players received entry from the qualifying draw:
  Jennifer Elie
  Lauren Embree
  Krista Hardebeck
  Ashley Weinhold

Champions

Men's singles

 Denis Kudla def.  Érik Chvojka, 5–7, 7–5, 6–1

Women's singles

 Julia Glushko def.  Johanna Konta, 6–3, 6–0

Men's doubles

 Austin Krajicek /  John Peers def.  Tennys Sandgren /  Rhyne Williams, 6–1, 7–6(7–4)

Women's doubles

 Shuko Aoyama /  Xu Yifan def.  Julia Glushko /  Olivia Rogowska, 7–5, 6–7(4–7), [10–4]

References

External links
Official website

Fifth Third Bank Tennis Championships
Fifth Third Bank Tennis Championships
2012
2012 in American tennis